Serapias neglecta, the scarce tongue-orchid, is a species of orchid endemic to southern Europe.

References

External links 
 Original description of Serapias neglecta, by Giuseppe De Notaris (1846), archived at the Biodiversity Heritage Library

neglecta
Plants described in 1846
Orchids of Europe
Taxa named by Giuseppe De Notaris